Timothy Lam (born 24 August 1997) is an American badminton player and coach.  He competed at the 2019 Pan American Games finished in the quarter finals stage. In 2021, Lam was confirmed as qualifying to compete for the US at the delayed 2020 Tokyo Olympics.

Achievements

Pan Am Junior Championships 
Boys' singles

Boys' doubles

Mixed doubles

BWF International Challenge/Series (1 title, 4 runners-up)
Men's singles

Men's doubles

  BWF International Challenge tournament
  BWF International Series tournament
  BWF Future Series tournament

Personal life
Lam graduated in 2018 in accounting from California State Polytechnic University, Pomona (Cal Poly Pomona) in Pomona, California.

References

External links 
 
Timothy Lam at the United States Olympic & Paralympic Committee

1997 births
Living people
Sportspeople from California
American male badminton players
Badminton players at the 2019 Pan American Games
Pan American Games competitors for the United States
Badminton players at the 2020 Summer Olympics
Olympic badminton players of the United States
California State Polytechnic University, Pomona alumni